U.S. Route 27 Alternate (US 27 Alt.) is an alternate route of US 27. It travels from the northwestern corner of Columbus northeast to just before Shiloh, north to Greenville, and northwest to Carrollton.

Route description

The alternate route starts at an intersection with the US 27 mainline in Columbus in Muscogee County, and initially runs northeast into Harris County, concurrent with Georgia State Route 85 (SR 85). Within Ellerslie, the route has a short concurrency with SR 315. The route splits from SR 85 south of Shiloh, on the Harris–Talbot county line, while moving onto SR 85A and briefly SR 116 before it cuts across the northwestern corner of Talbot County. It then enters Meriwether County, running along the southeastern edge of FDR State Park while briefly crossing SR 190, and curving from the northwest to the northeast. Heading briefly northwest again through FDR State Park this time and then north into Warm Springs, now co-signed with SR 41, the route turns north and heads into a traffic circle with SR 18 which joins US 27A through Greenville which leaves the concurrency at SR 109. Later it runs through Luthersville where it intersects SR 54 before heading into Coweta County.

In Moreland US 27 Alternate is joined by a concurrency with U.S. Route 29,  which also serves as the northern terminus of Georgia State Route 41. However, like its parent route, it joins the alternate in another concurrency. US ALT 27/29/SR 14 serves as the main road through downtown Moreland, and after passing by the Lewis Grizzard Museum, the Atlanta and West Point Railroad main line moves to the west side of the road at a power line right-of-way. It curves away from the tracks again at the intersection of "Old Highway 29," and after winding around the northwestern edge of Newnan-Coweta County Airport, Interstate 85 (I-85) is encountered at a diamond interchange (Exit 41). Just north of that interchange it encounters the southern terminus of a concurrency with Georgia State Route 16. Together, US ALT 27/29/SRs 14/16 run through marshland around Pearl Springs Lake and East Newnan Lake as it enter Newnan. The routes cross over that A&WP Railroad Line between Newnan South Industrial Road and Corinth Road. From there it runs through the Greenville Street-LaGrange Street Historic District (signed as the Greenville-LaGrange Historic District), before passing the Coweta County Superior Courthouse and running over a bridge above a former Central of Georgia Railway line. Greenville Street ends at Salbide Avenue and US ALT 27/29/SRs 14/16 becomes a one-way pair along Jefferson Street and LaGrange Street, both of which are part of the Newnan Commercial Historic District. It also runs along both sides of the historic Coweta County Courthouse between Broad and Washington Streets. At Posey Street, the routes are joined by another concurrency with Georgia State Route 34. The routes turn left onto Clark Street as they join another concurrency with westbound Georgia State Route 34, only for US 29/SR 14 to leave the US ALT 27/SRs 16/34 concurrency one block later at Jackson Street. As US 27 Alternate/SR 16/SR 34 moves from Clark Street to Temple Avenue, they begin to head northwest out of Newnan, only for SR 34 to leave that concurrency at Franklin Road.

Crossing a bridge over the Chattahoochee River, and thus the Coweta-Carroll County line, the routes run through Whiteburg where they intersect SR 5 before briefly turning west-northwest between the communities of Banning and Clem, then turns back to the northwest. At the intersection with SR 166 in Carrollton, US 27 ALT/SR 16 makes a left turn with westbound SR 166 joining that concurrency until finally reaching its northern terminus, at a diamond interchange with US 27/SR 1. SR 166 continues west towards Ranburne, Alabama, while SR 16 continues north along US 27 through downtown Carrollton until breaking away and running to the northwest toward GA 100 south of I-20 near Tallapoosa and Waco.

The following portions of US 27 Alt. are part of the National Highway System, a system of routes determined to be the most important for the nation's economy, mobility, and defense:
The entire Muscogee County portion
From the I-85 interchange (on US 29/SR 14), just south of East Newnan, to just north of the southern end of the SR 34 concurrency (on US 29/SR 14/SR 16) in Newnan
From an indeterminate point southeast of Carrollton to its northern terminus in the city.

Major intersections

See also

References

External links

 

Alternate (Georgia)
27 Alternate
27 Alternate (Georgia)
Transportation in Muscogee County, Georgia
Transportation in Harris County, Georgia
Transportation in Talbot County, Georgia
Transportation in Meriwether County, Georgia
Transportation in Coweta County, Georgia
Carroll
Transportation in Columbus, Georgia